Oxalis ortgiesii, the fishtail oxalis, is a species of Oxalis (wood sorrel) native to Bolivia, Ecuador, and Peru.

References

 Gartenflora 24:1, t. 817. 1875
 Brako, L. & J. L. Zarucchi. 1993. Catalogue of the flowering plants and gymnosperms of Peru. Monogr. Syst. Bot. Missouri Bot. Gard. 45.
 Jørgensen, P. M. & S. León-Yánez, eds. 1999. Catalogue of the vascular plants of Ecuador. Monogr. Syst. Bot. Missouri Bot. Gard. 75.
 Liberty Hyde Bailey Hortorium. 1976. Hortus third.
 Lourteig, A. 2000. Oxalis L. subgéneros Monoxalis (Small) Lourt., Oxalis y Trifidus Lourt. Bradea 7:136.
 Macbride, J. F. et al., eds. 1936–1971. Flora of Peru.; new ser. 1980-

ortgiesii
Plants described in 1875